Peerce is a surname. Notable people with the surname include:

Jan Peerce (1904–1984), American opera singer
Larry Peerce (born 1930), American film and television director

See also
Pearce (surname)
Pierce (surname)